The Consecration of Aloysius Gonzaga as patron saint of youth is a c.1763 painting attributed to Francisco de Goya and now owned by the town of Jaraba but stored in the Saragossa Museum in Saragossa.

History
It resulted from a commission by the Jesuit church of Santa María del Pilar de Calatayud, now known as San Juan el Real. After the Jesuits were expelled from Spain in 1767, the painting went to the sanctuary of the Virgin of Jaraba, where it was rediscovered in 1985.

Description
It shows saint Aloysius Gonzaga being consecrated as the patron saint of young people by pope Benedict XIII, who taught young Italians to take the saint as their example, as indicated by the Latin words on the pope's speech-bubble "Inspice, FAC ET secundum EXEMPLAR" (Look and follow his example).  The pope points at the saint, who appears in glory in Jesuit robes among angels and bearing a bouquet of lilies, alluding to his purity.

Goya was probably influenced by his tutor Joseph Luzán. The painting is in line with the Italian rococo school and can be seen to be youthful in the lack of skill in some of the figure drawing.

See also
List of works by Francisco Goya

External links
Jarabaturismo.com
Fundaciongoyaenaragon.es

1763 paintings
Paintings by Francisco Goya
Paintings in Zaragoza
Aloysius Gonzaga